Gazak or Gazk or Gezak may refer to:
 Gazak, Bushehr
 Gezak, Fars
 Gazak, Kerman
 Gazk, Ravar, Kerman Province
 Gazak, Sistan and Baluchestan
 Gazak, Iranshahr, Sistan and Baluchestan Province